Spoonful James is an American indie/soul/blues band. The group was first formed in Auburn, Alabama; during 1996, and over the years they have played with many talented artists including: Government Mule, Little Feat, Buddy Miles, and the Jerry Garcia Band. The song "Seven Mile Breakdown" - (released May 4, 2009) by American Idol winner Taylor Hicks; was originally recorded by them.

Current members
Wynn Christian - Lead vocals, guitars (1996–present)
Quinn "Dirty" Borland - Bass guitar, backing vocals (1996–present)
Eric Baath - Keyboards (2001–present)
Patrick Lunceford - Drums, backing vocals (1998–present)

Discography
Spoonful James (1997)
Leave That Door Open (1998)
"The Sarcophagus Demo" (2000)
Seven Mile Breakdown (2001)
Are You Listening? (2010)

References

External links
 Official band website

Indie rock musical groups from Alabama